Pavoraja pseudonitida, commonly known as the false peacock skate, is a species of fish in the family Arhynchobatidae. It lives in depths ranging from 212 to 512 meters in the western Pacific Ocean off the coast of north-eastern Australia. Its maximum size is  total length.

Pavoraja pseudonitida might be the most common skate on the upper continental slope of northeast Australia. Although it can occur as by-catch, current levels of fishing in its range are unlikely to pose a significant threat.

References

Pavoraja
Fauna of Queensland
Taxa named by Peter R. Last
Taxa named by Stephen Mallick
Taxa named by Gordon K. Yearsley
Fish described in 2008